Sudest, also known as Tagula, is an Oceanic language of Papua New Guinea.

Name
The name Sudest is a word meaning 'southeast' in French or Italian.

Phonology

Consonants 

  are originally bilabial, although many speakers under the influence of English pronounce them as labio-dental .

Vowels

External links 
 Paradisec has two collections of Arthur Cappell's materials (AC1, AC2) and one collection of Malcolm Ross's (MR1) materials that include Sudest-language materials.

References 

Papuan Tip languages
Languages of Milne Bay Province